Starksia culebrae or culebra blenny is a species of labrisomid blenny native the waters around the Caribbean islands of the Antilles.

References

culebrae
Fish described in 1899